Maimouna Salif (b. 1993), known professionally as Celaviedmai, is an Irish rapper.

Career
In 2013, Celaviedmai was one of 3 Irish acts chosen to open for Lil Wayne at the O2 Arena. Her debut single, Dive, was released in 2018. She has also opened for Mac Miller, Tinchy Stryder, Sneakbo and Jafaris. Her 2020 single, Questions, topped Spotify's Rap IE playlist. In 2020, she was one of the acts featured in the Hot Press Lockdown Sessions. She has collaborated with Alicia Raye, Nealo and Alan Mckee. She was also featured in the Department of Culture, Heritage and the Gaeltacht's The Y&E Series in June 2020.

Celaviedmai has been a supporter of the Black Lives Matter movement in Ireland, and has spoken about her experiences with everyday racism in Ireland. Celaviedmai was one of the organisers of the Youth Against Racism & Inequality Day of Action on 25 July 2020, which took place in Dublin, Cork, Limerick and Galway.

Personal life
Celaviedmai is the stage name of Maimouna Salif. She was raised in Galway. Her parents emigrated to Ireland from the Ivory Coast.

Discography
 Dive single (2018)
 Confessions single (2019)
 Reckless single (2020)
 Questions single (2020) featuring Nealo and Alan Mckee
 Love Wins single (2020) collaboration with Alicia Raye

References

External links 
 Celaviedmai on Spotify
 

Irish women rappers
1993 births
Living people
Black Irish people
Irish people of Ivorian descent